This is a list of television programs currently and formerly broadcast by Cartoon Network in India. The network was launched on 1 May 1995 and airs mainly animated programmings.

Current programming 
 Courage the Cowardly Dog
Digimon Adventure
 Dragon Ball Super
 Grizzy & the Lemmings
 Lamput
 My Gym Partner's a Monkey
 Teen Titans Teen Titans Go! The Tom and Jerry Show Former programming 
 Animated series 
 2 Stupid Dogs A Pup Named Scooby-Doo Adventure Time Akbar and Birbal The All New Popeye Hour Alvin and the Chipmunks Amar Chitra Katha Andy Pandy Angelina Ballerina Angelo Rules Angry Birds Toons Animalia Animal Control Aqua Teen Hunger Force Archie's Weird Mysteries The Avengers: Earth's Mightiest Heroes Baby Looney Tunes The Backyardigans Bandbudh Aur Budbak Bakugan Battle Brawlers Bakugan Battle Brawlers: New Vestroia Battle B-Daman Beyblade series Blue Dragon Bobobo-bo Bo-bobo Capeta Batman: The Animated Series Batman Beyond  Batman: The Brave and the Bold Beast Machines: Transformers Beat Monsters Ben 10 (2005) Ben 10: Alien ForceBen 10: Ultimate Alien Ben 10: Omniverse Ben 10 (2016) Beware the Batman Birdman and the Galaxy Trio Bob the Builder Bob the Builder: Project Build It Boo! Camp Lazlo Captain Planet and the Planeteers Captor Sakura Chowder Cloudy with a Chance of Meatballs Codename: Kids Next Door Code Lyoko 
 Courage the Cowardly Dog Craig of the Creek Crime Time Dabangg Dexter's Laboratory Digimon 
 Dragon Ball Dragon Ball Z Dragon Ball Kai Dragon Ball Super Duel Masters Dragon Tales DreamWorks DragonsDuck Dodgers Ed, Edd n Eddy Ekans - Ek Se Badhkar Snake Exchange Student Zero Fantastic Max Firehouse Tales Fish Police The Flintstone Comedy Show The Flintstone Funnies The Flintstone Kids Foster's Home for Imaginary Friends Franklin Fred Flintstone and Friends The Flintstones G.I. Joe: A Real American Hero (1985 TV series) G.I. Joe: A Real American Hero (1989 TV series) Galtar and the Golden Lance Garfield and Friends Generator Rex Gon Green Lantern: The Animated Series Grizzy and the Lemmings
 The Grim Adventures of Billy & Mandy Grim & Evil Harry and His Bucket Full of Dinosaurs Harvey Birdman, Attorney at Law He-Man and the Masters of the Universe Heidi The HerculoidsHero: 108 Hi Hi Puffy AmiYumi Hikari Sentai Maskman Home Movies Hong Kong Phooey Horrid Henry Hot Wheels AcceleRacers Hot Wheels Battle Force 5 I Am Weasel Inazuma Eleven Iron Man: Armored Adventures Jackie Chan Adventures The Jetsons Johnny Bravo Johnny Test Jonny Quest Josie and the Pussycats Jumanji Jungle Tales Justice League Justice League Unlimited Kaiketsu Zorori Kiteretsu Kiba Kipper the Dog The Koala Brothers Krypto the Superdog Lamput  The Land Before Time Larva Legends of Chima Lego Ninjago: Masters of Spinjitzu The Legend of Snow White The Life and Times of Juniper Lee Looney TunesThe Looney Tunes ShowLeague of Super EvilMaca and RoniMad: The Animated SeriesMake Way for NoddyThe Marvelous Misadventures of FlapjackThe Mask: Animated SeriesMatt Hatter ChroniclesMax Steel (2000 TV series)Max Steel (2013 TV series) MechamatoMegas XLRMen in Black: The SeriesMighty MagiswordsMike, Lu & OgMiss Spider's Sunny Patch Friends Mix Master Mobile Suit GundamMixelsMoby Dick and Mighty MightorThe Moxy Show¡Mucha Lucha!The Mummy: The Animated SeriesMy Gym Partner's A MonkeyMy Knight and Me Naruto Nate is LateThe New Adventures of Captain PlanetThe New Adventures of HanumanThe New Adventures of Jonny QuestThe New Adventures of Speed RacerThe New Batman AdventuresThe New Fred and Barney ShowThe New Scooby-Doo MoviesThe New Scooby and Scrappy-Doo Show Ninja Robots Obocchama KunOggy and the Cockroaches OK K.O.! Let's Be Heroes One PieceOswaldOver the Garden WallOzzy & DrixThe Pebbles and Bamm-Bamm ShowThe Perils of Penelope PitstopPet AlienPinguPinky and the BrainPinky, Elmyra & the BrainThe Plucky Duck Show Pokémon Powerpuff Girls ZPopeye and SonThe Popeye ShowPopeye the SailorThe Porky Pig ShowPostman Pat The Powerpuff Girls (1998 TV series)The Real Adventures of Jonny QuestRichie RichRicochet Rabbit & Droop-a-LongThe Road Runner ShowRobotboy Roll No 21RubbadubbersRunning ManSabrina: The Animated SeriesSamurai JackScooby-Doo, Where Are You!Scooby-Doo! Mystery IncorporatedScooby-Doo and Scrappy-Doo (1979 TV series)Scooby-Doo and Scrappy-Doo (1980 TV series)The Scooby-Doo ShowScooby-Doo, Where Are You!Secret Mountain Fort AwesomeThe Secret SaturdaysSealab 2021Shaggy & Scooby-Doo Get a Clue!ShazzanSheep in the Big CitySitting DucksSkunk Fu!The SmurfsSonic BoomSpace GhostSpace Ghost Coast to CoastThe Spectacular Spider-ManSpider-Man: The New Animated SeriesStar Wars: Clone WarsStar Wars: The Clone WarsStatic ShockSteven UniverseStrawberry ShortcakeStuart Little: The Animated SeriesThe Super Hero Squad ShowSuper BheemSummer Camp IslandSuper FriendsSuperman: The Animated SeriesSupernoobs Super ShiroSWAT Kats: The Radical SquadronThe Sylvester & Tweety MysteriesSym-Bionic TitanTaffyTaz-ManiaTDPITeen TitansTeenage Mutant Ninja Turtles The Grim Adventures of Billy & MandyThomas & FriendsThunderCats (1985 TV series)ThunderCats (2011 TV series)Time SquadTiny Toon AdventuresTik Tak TailTom and JerryThe Tom and Jerry Comedy ShowThe Tom and Jerry Show (1975 TV series)Tom & Jerry KidsTom and Jerry in New YorkTop Cat Transformers: Cyberverse Transformers: Robots in DisguiseTransformers: PrimeTransformers: Animated Transformers: Armada Transformers: Energon Transformers: Cybertron Transformers: Robots in Disguise Trouble Chocolate Ultimate MuscleUnikitty!Victor and ValentinoWhat a Cartoon!What's New, Scooby-Doo?Whatever Happened to... Robot Jones?Wolverine and the X-MenWow! Wow! Wubbzy!Xiaolin ChroniclesXiaolin ShowdownX-Men: Evolution The 13 Ghosts of Scooby-Doo The Addams Family The Adventures of Chhota Birbal The Adventures of Tenali Raman 
 The Adventures of Tintin The Batman The Brak Show Yo-kai Watch The Bugs Bunny ShowThe Yogi Bear Show We Bare BearsYogi's Treasure HuntYoung Justice  Zatch Bell! Live-action/mixed 
 Cambala Investigation Agency Chouseishin Gransazer Galli Galli Sim Sim Genseishin Justirisers Sazer X Skatoony Teletubbies Films 
 Arnab aur Jadui Locket (2014)
 Bhootraja Aur Ronnie 2 (2014)
 Chakra: The Invincible (2013)
 Kid Krrish (2013)	
 Kid Krrish: Mission Bhutan (2014)
 Kid Krrish: Mystery in Mongolia (2014)
 Kid Krrish: Shakalaka Africa (2015)Krishna: The Birth (2006)
 Krishna in Vrindavan (2006)
 Krishna: Kansa Vadha (2006)	
 Krishna: Maakhan Chor (2006)
 My Name Is Raj (2011)	
 My Name Is Raj 2 (2012)
 My Name Is Raj 3: Attack of Demons (2013)
 My Name Is Raj 4: Vizukama Ki Takaar (2014)
 My Name is Raj 5: Return of Zohak (2015)
 Vikram Betal  (2005)
 Tripura - The Three Cities of Maya (2011)

 Specials 
  Mangal Pandey Special (2005)
 Johnny Goes to Bollywood (2009)Kris Aur Sharukhan Khan Ki Dilwale Bollywood Class (2015)Oggy Ki Birthday Party (2015)
 Teen Titans Go! Special: Dhoond Robin Dhoond(2022) Teen Titans Go! Special: Superstar Robin(2022)''

Programming blocks

See also 
 List of Indian animated television series
 List of programmes broadcast by Pogo
 Super Hungama
 Nickelodeon (India)
 Pogo TV

References

External links
 Cartoon Network India official website

Cartoon Network (Indian TV channel)
Lists of Indian television series
Cartoon_Network-related_lists